The 104th United States Congress began on January 3, 1995. There were nine new senators (all Republicans) and 86 new representatives (13 Democrats, 73 Republicans), as well as one new delegate (an independent), at the start of the first session. Additionally, three senators (one Democrat, two Republicans) and seven representatives (four Democrats, three Republicans) took office on various dates in order to fill vacancies during the 104th Congress before it ended on January 3, 1997.

Senate

Took office January 3, 1995

Took office during the 104th Congress

House of Representatives

Took office January 3, 1995

Non-voting members

Took office during the 104th Congress

See also 
List of United States senators in the 104th Congress
List of members of the United States House of Representatives in the 104th Congress by seniority

Notes 

104th United States Congress
104